Bjerke may refer to:

As a surname 
 Bjerke (surname), a Norwegian surname

Places 
 Bjerke (borough), a borough of the city Oslo, Norway
 Bjerke Upper Secondary School
 Mount Bjerke, a mountain in Antarctica

Other 
 Bjerke IL, a Norwegian sport club based in Akershus
 Bjerke Travbane, a racing track